Jorge Álvarez (born 3 August 1989) is a Cuban sports shooter. He competed in the men's 25 metre rapid fire pistol event at the 2020 Summer Olympics.

References

External links
 

1989 births
Living people
Cuban male sport shooters
Olympic shooters of Cuba
Shooters at the 2020 Summer Olympics
Pan American Games gold medalists for Cuba
Pan American Games medalists in shooting
Shooters at the 2019 Pan American Games
Medalists at the 2019 Pan American Games
Sportspeople from Havana
21st-century Cuban people